Proprotein convertase subtilisin/kexin type 6 is an protease that in humans is encoded by the PCSK6 gene which is located in chromosome 15. Pcsk6 is a calcium-dependent serine endoprotease that catalyzes the post-translational modification of precursor proteins from its ‘latent’ form to the cleaved ‘active’ form. Active Pcsk6 has been reported to process substrates such as transforming growth factor β, pro-albumin, von Willebrand factor, and corin. Clinically, Pcsk6 is suggested to play a role in left/right asymmetry, structural asymmetry of the brain, handedness, tumor progression, hemostasis, and cardiovascular diseases.

Function 

The protein encoded by this gene belongs to the subtilisin-like proprotein convertase family. The members of this family are proprotein convertases that process latent precursor proteins into their biologically active products. This encoded protein is a calcium-dependent serine endoprotease that can cleave precursor protein at their paired basic amino acid processing sites. Some of its substrates are - transforming growth factor beta related proteins, pro-albumin, von Willebrand factor, and corin. Alternatively spliced transcript variants encoding different isoforms have been identified.

Clinical significance 

During development: Throughout development, the spatial and temporal expression of pcsk6 regulates embryogenesis by activating TGFβ related differentiation factors, which include BMP and Nodal. Elevated levels of Pcsk6 was detected in maternal decidual cells of the implantation site and the extraembryonic ectoderm.  The regulation of proper gradient of Nodal and BMPs is crucial for gastrulation, proximal-distal axis, and establishment of left-right axis patterning.

Developmental Pcsk6 knockout studies found that mice embryos that lack Pcsk6 develop heterotaxia, left pulmonary isomerism, and/or craniofacial malformations due to disruption in specification of anterior-posterior and left-right axis that resulted from the dysregulation of Nodal and BMP signaling.

In humans, Pcsk6 VNTR polymorphism is associated with the structural asymmetry of the frontal and temporal lobe, and  degree of handedness.

Cardiovascular disease: Pcsk6 is increasing interest as indicator and factor of cardiovascular disease. Pcsk6 KO mice was shown to develop salt-sensitive hypertension due to failure of pro-corin activation crucial to atrial natriuretic peptide regulation of blood pressure. A hypertensive patient was found to have a G/A mutation on the PCSK6 gene that resulted in an Asp282Asn (D282N) substitution at the Pcsk6 catalytic domain, which in turn, hinders corin processing. In vascular remodeling, Pcsk6 was found to induce smooth muscle cell migration in response to PDGFB by activating MMP14. When Pcsk6 was knocked out, the intimal hyperplasia response to in vivo carotid ligation was lowered.

Other: This gene is thought to play a role in tumor progression.

References

Further reading